"When We Were Young" is a song by Australian pop band Human Nature, released in March 2001 as the second single from their third album Human Nature.

Track listing

European single
 "When We Were Young" (UK single version) – 3:28 
 "When We Were Young" (Studio 347 Radio Remix) – 3:38

Enhanced CD 1
 "When We Were Young" – 3:28 			
 "When We Were Young" (Studio 347 Extended Remix) – 4:11 	
 "Eternal Flame" (Susanna Hoffs, Tom Kelly, Billy Steinberg) 		
 "When We Were Young" (video) – 3:27

Enhanced CD 2
 "When We Were Young" (UK single version) – 3:28 	
 "When We Were Young" (Studio 347 Radio Remix) – 3:38
 "He Don't Love You (Amen Radio Remix) – 3:33
 "Wishes" (Alan Glass, Andrew Klippel) – 4:02
 "When We Were Young" (video) – 3:27

UK Cassette single
 "When We Were Young" – 3:28
 "When We Were Young" (Studio 347 Extended Remix) – 4:11
 "Eternal Flame"

12" single
 "When We Were Young" (Studio 347 Extended Remix) – 4:11
 "When We Were Young" (Studio 347 Radio Remix) – 3:38

Charts

External links
 Official site
 When We Were Young at Discogs

2001 singles
Human Nature (band) songs
Songs written by Tim Woodcock
Songs written by Eliot Kennedy
Songs written by Tim Lever
Songs written by Mike Percy (musician)
2000 songs
Columbia Records singles
Songs written by Andrew Tierney
Songs written by Michael Tierney (musician)
Songs about nostalgia